May mean: 
Ministry of Parliamentary Affairs (India)
Ministry of Parliamentary Affairs (Sri Lanka)